The 2020 Engie Open Andrézieux-Bouthéon 42 was a professional tennis tournament played on indoor hard courts. It was the tenth edition of the tournament which was part of the 2020 ITF Women's World Tennis Tour. It took place in Andrézieux-Bouthéon, France between 27 January and 2 February 2020.

Singles main-draw entrants

Seeds

 1 Rankings are as of 20 January 2020.

Other entrants
The following players received wildcards into the singles main draw:
  Audrey Albié
  Tessah Andrianjafitrimo
  Myrtille Georges
  Carole Monnet

The following players received entry into the singles main draw as special exempts:
  Dejana Radanović
  Harmony Tan

The following players received entry from the qualifying draw:
  Manon Arcangioli
  Jaqueline Cristian
  Gaëlle Desperrier
  Eléonora Molinaro
  Conny Perrin
  Raluca Șerban
  Clara Tauson
  Anna Zaja

The following player received entry as a lucky loser:
  Sofia Shapatava

Champions

Singles

 Ysaline Bonaventure def.  Arantxa Rus, 6–4, 7–6(7–3)

Doubles

 Jaqueline Cristian /  Elena-Gabriela Ruse def.  Ekaterine Gorgodze /  Raluca Șerban, 7–6(8–6), 6–7(4–7), [10–8]

References

External links
 2020 Engie Open Andrézieux-Bouthéon 42 at ITFtennis.com
 Official website

2020 ITF Women's World Tennis Tour
2020 in French tennis
January 2020 sports events in France
February 2020 sports events in France
Open Andrézieux-Bouthéon 42